Havelock North Wanderers is a soccer club in Havelock North, New Zealand. The club was formed in 1947 as Hastings Wanderers, changing to their current name in 1968. 

They won promotion to the New Zealand Football Central League for 2022 after finishing first in the Lotto Central Federation League, then beating Wellington United 6–6 in a home and away playoff by away goals. They had twice before won the Central Federation League in 2017 and 2019, but both times lost their playoff games against Waterside Karori and Petone FC respectively, missing out on promotion.

The Wanderers also regularly compete in the Chatham Cup, New Zealand's premier knockout tournaments for men, with their best finishes being the fifth round in 1982 and 2003 cups before losing to local rivals Napier City Rovers and Lower Hutt.

References

External links
Official website
Ultimate NZ Soccer Profile
New Zealand 2004/05 Season Results

Association football clubs in New Zealand
Sport in the Hawke's Bay Region
1947 establishments in New Zealand